Lina Iris Viktor (born 1987) is a British-Liberian visual artist based in New York.  The New York Times described her paintings as "queenly self-portraits with a futuristic edge". The artist is represented by Pilar Corrias, London.

Biography
Lina Iris Viktor was born in 1987 in the U.K. to parents from Liberia, West Africa. She studied film at Sarah Lawrence College and photography and design at the School of Visual Arts in New York City. In 2018 Viktor was involved in a legal dispute with Kendrick Lamar involving appropriation of her imagery for the video for All the Stars by SZA and Lamar. The dispute was settled.

Exhibitions 

 2014: Arcadia, Gallery 151, New York, NY
 2016: Africa Forecast: Fashioning Contemporary Life, Spelman College Museum of Fine Art, Atlanta, Georgia
 2017: Black Exodus: Act I — Materia Prima, Amar Gallery, London, United Kingdom
 2018: A Haven. A Hell. A Dream Deferred, New Orleans Museum of Art, New Orleans, Louisiana
 2018: The Black Ark, The Armory Show | Mariane Ibrahim Gallery, New York, New York
 2018: Re-Significations: European Blackamoors, Africana Readings, Zisa Zona Arti Contemporanee (ZAC) Manifesta European Contemporary Art Biennial 12, Palermo, Italy
 2018: Hopes Springing High — Gifts Of Art By African American Artists, Crocker Art Museum, Sacramento, CA
 2019: Some Are Born To Endless Night — Dark Matter, Autograph, London, United Kingdom
 2022: Rite of Passage: Lina Iris Viktor with César, Louise Bourgeois, Louise Nevelson, and Yves Klein - LGDR, London, United Kingdom
 2022: In the Black Fantastic, Hayward Gallery, London, United Kingdom

References

Further reading

External links 

 

21st-century British women artists
1987 births
Black British artists
Living people